Epilepsy, juvenile myoclonic 3 is a protein that in humans is encoded by the EJM3 gene.

References